Georg Wilhelm Muncke or Georg Wilhelm Munke (28 November 1772, in Hilligsfeld – 17 October 1847, in Großkmehlen) was a German physicist.

From 1797 to 1810 he worked as an administrator at the Georgianum in Hanover. In 1810 he became a professor at the University of Marburg, where he gave lectures in mathematics and experimental physics. From 1817 up until his death in 1847 he was a professor of physics at the University of Heidelberg. In 1826 he became an honorary member of the Russian Academy of Sciences.

Published works 
 System der atomistischen Physik. Nach den neuesten Erfahrungen und Versuchen dargestellt (1809) – System of atomic physics.
 Handbuch der Naturlehre, (2 volumes, 1829) – Manual of natural science.
 Die ersten Elemente der gesammten Naturlehre zum Gebrauche für höhere Schulen und Gymnasien, 1842 – The first elements of the doctrine of nature.
 Populäre Wärmelehre; oder, Darstellung des Wesens und Verhaltens der Wärme, 1847 – Popular thermodynamics; or, representation of the nature and behavior of heat.
Also, he was the author of scientific papers on magnetism, electromagnetism, thermoelectrics, telegraphy, etc. With other scientists, he collaborated on a new edition of Johann Samuel Traugott Gehler's Physikalisches Wörterbunch (11 volumes, 1825–45).

See also
Needle telegraph

References 

1772 births
1847 deaths
People from Hamelin
Academic staff of Heidelberg University
Academic staff of the University of Marburg
19th-century German physicists